PDU may stand for:
 Project for Democratic Union, a European open-source think tank
 Partia për Drejtësi dhe Unitet (Party for Justice and Unity), a former political party in Albania
 Partidul Democrat al Unirii (Democratic Union Party), a political group in Romania
 Paysandú Airport (IATA: PDU)
 Power distribution unit, for electrical power
 Protocol data unit, in telecommunications
 Procedure defined unit, a unit of measurement relative to a specific application
 Professional Development Units, credits toward certification or re-certification at Project Management Institute (PMI)